Razès is a historical area in southwestern France, in today's Aude département.

Several communes of the département include Razès in their name:
 Bellegarde-du-Razès
 Belvèze-du-Razès
 Fenouillet-du-Razès
 Fonters-du-Razès
 Mazerolles-du-Razès
 Peyrefitte-du-Razès
 Saint-Couat-du-Razès
 Villarzel-du-Razès

See also
County of Razès

Geography of Aude